Vadim Sergeevich Epanchintsev (born 16 March 1976) is a Russian former professional ice hockey player and coach. He was most recently the head coach for HC Spartak Moscow of the Kontinental Hockey League (KHL).

References

External links 

  Профиль на сайте КХЛ

1976 births
Living people
People from Orsk
Tampa Bay Lightning draft picks
HC Spartak Moscow players
Cleveland Lumberjacks players
Metallurg Novokuznetsk players
Severstal Cherepovets players
Ak Bars Kazan players
Atlant Moscow Oblast players
HC CSKA Moscow players
HC Dynamo Moscow players
HC Neftekhimik Nizhnekamsk players
Russian ice hockey centres
Russian ice hockey coaches
Sportspeople from Orenburg Oblast